Ganjak may refer to:
 Ganjak, Jask, Hormozgan Province
 Ganjak, Lirdaf, Hormozgan Province
 Ganjak, Sistan and Baluchestan